Live Baby Live is the first live album by Australian rock band INXS. It was released on 11 November 1991 and features tracks recorded during their Summer XS Tour in Paris, New York, Chicago, London, Dublin, Glasgow, Rio de Janeiro, Montreal, Spain, Switzerland, Melbourne, Sydney, Philadelphia, and Las Vegas. The album peaked in the top 10 on both the Australian and United Kingdom albums charts. It has sold over one million copies in the United States, earning a platinum certification by the RIAA. A single, "Shining Star", was released from and ahead of the album on 2 November. It became the group's ninth Top 40 single on the UK Singles Chart, but failed to appear on the Billboard Hot 100 in the US, despite reaching the top 20 of the rock charts.

The title's two uses of 'live', indistinguishable by spelling alone, are pronounced differently – according to The Greatest Hits album's accompanying booklet – the first is pronounced to rhyme with 'give', whereas the second is pronounced as in 'five'.

Background
In September 1990, Australian rock band, INXS released their seventh studio album, X, which was produced by Chris Thomas (Sex Pistols, Pink Floyd, The Pretenders, Elton John) and it peaked at No. 3 in Australia, No. 2 in the United Kingdom, No. 5 in the United States, No. 5 in Switzerland and No. 10 in Sweden. It followed in the same vein as Kick (1987), and added harmonica to some songs. X scored hits with "Suicide Blonde" and "Disappear" (both Top 10 in the US), "Suicide Blonde" peaked at No. 2 in Australia, No. 11 in the UK and in Switzerland. Other singles from X were "Bitter Tears" and "By My Side" but they had less chart success.

Lead singer Michael Hutchence's romance with Australian pop singer Kylie Minogue brought the group a new audience of fans. INXS performed at Wembley Stadium on 13 July 1991, during their Summer XS Tour stop in London to a sold-out audience of 74,000 fans. This performance was recorded and filmed to become their live album Live Baby Live (a video version was also released under the same title), which was released on 11 November 1991 and peaked in the Top 30 of both the Australian and UK albums charts, but had less success on the Billboard 200. The album was co-produced by Mark Opitz and INXS.

Reception

Controversially, Ian Meldrum questioned the validity of the album's 'live' status. Allmusic gave the album one star out of five. AllMusic's reviewer, Stephen Thomas Erlewine, was unimpressed with Live Baby Live, "[it] is a lifeless live album ... All of the performances sound like the studio versions, stripped of their excitement and savvy productions". The album reached No. 3 on the ARIA Albums Chart and No. 8 on the UK Albums Chart but was less popular in the United States, peaking at No. 72 on the Billboard 200. Nevertheless, the album was certified platinum by RIAA for sales of over one million copies.

The album's only single, "Shining Star", appeared ahead of the album on 2 November. It is the one new song recorded for the album and peaked at No. 21 on the ARIA Singles Chart, at No. 27 on the UK Singles Chart, becoming the group's ninth Top 40 single there. In the US, it peaked at No. 4 on the Modern Rock Tracks and No. 14 on the Mainstream Rock Tracks charts, but failed to appear on the Billboard Hot 100.

Track listing

Video release

Wembley Stadium
Live Baby Live is a live video of INXS's performance at Wembley Stadium directed by David Mallet. It was released simultaneously as the live CD of the same name. The concert was the second-last of a string of concerts in London for INXS's Summer XS Tour. The video was re-released as a DVD in 2003 and was digitally remixed and mastered in 5.1 surround sound. The band played to a sold-out crowd of over 72,000 fans. Special features include band interviews and backstage footage. The performance was held on 13 July 1991, on the six-year anniversary of the original Live Aid at the same venue. The video footage was shot with sixteen 35 mm cameras that included one in a helicopter that circled the venue. Amazon.com's editorial reviewer, Tom Keogh, felt "fans can rejoice over the release of this buoyant concert film ... the late Michael Hutchence, is at his feral-romantic best, stalking and swiveling his way through an energized set of welterweight pop". Australian country musician Steve Forde declared, "I missed out on seeing Michael do his thing in person, but that Live Baby Live DVD is bad ass! We put that DVD on the big screen in the front lounge of the tour bus. It's like going to a 101 class to be a frontman rock star. Wembley Stadium chock full, singing every word. Awesome. My favourite track from that set is definitely 'Devil Inside'. Is he still relevant? Absolutely".

Video track listing
 "Guns in the Sky"
 "New Sensation"
 "I Send a Message"
 "The Stairs"
 "Know the Difference"
 "Disappear"
 "By My Side"
 "Hear That Sound"
 "Original Sin"
 "The Loved One"
 "Wild Life"
 "Mystify"
 "Bitter Tears"
 "Suicide Blonde"
 "What You Need"
 "Kick"
 "Need You Tonight"
 "Mediate"
 "Never Tear Us Apart"
 "Who Pays the Price"
 "Devil Inside"
 "Shining Star"

Theatrical release

In 2019 Live Baby Live at Wembley Stadium had been remastered in 4K resolution and cinematic 16:9 widescreen accompanied with newly restored sound at Abbey Road Studios by Giles Martin and Sam Okell presented in a Dolby Atmos mix. Footage for the performance of "Lately" was discovered and was added, being the first time that the full length concert was released with the original setlist, the audio having been previously released as a bonus feature on the DVD release. 
The film was given a theatrical release for the first time for one-night-only in Australia and New Zealand on 14 November 2019, a U.K., Ireland and continental European release on 27 November and in North and South America on 9 December. 
A soundtrack for the concert film was released on 15 November on CD, Vinyl, and digital services.

Background
The film was released on DVD from a 35mm negative, however, INXS manager Chris Murphy had been looking for the original film cans for over a decade. Murphy searched for them in the United States and the United Kingdom; it was eventually discovered in Sydney. During the Ultra HD restoration process, the film was carefully repositioned shot-by-shot during a twelve-month period.

Release
Live Baby Live had its world premiere at the Byron Bay International Film Festival in late October 2019. Prior to this, special screenings in July had also taken place including one held in New York city.
The concert film was first released in Australia and New Zealand on 14 November 2019 by Fathom Events and in Europe including the U.K., Ireland, Greece, the Netherlands by Cinevents. It is intended to be released on up to 1000 screens worldwide.

A fifty-seven-minute edited cut of the restored concert was aired on BBC Two at 11pm on 28 December 2019.

Box office
INXS: Live Baby Live grossed £48,161 ($62,312) in the United Kingdom and $307,818 in other territories, for a total worldwide gross of $370,361.

Home media
Eagle Rock Entertainment released the concert film in the US and Canada on DVD and Blu-ray Disc and in the United Kingdom on DVD, Blu-ray and 4K Ultra HD, alongside Blu-ray and DVD editions packaged with the CD soundtrack on 26 June 2020.

2019 remastered track listing
 "Guns in the Sky"	
 "New Sensation"
 "I Send A Message"
 "The Stairs"
 "Know The Difference"
 "Disappear"
 "By My Side"
 "Hear That Sound"
 "Original Sin"
 "Lately"
 "The Loved One"
 "Wild Life"
 "Mystify"
 "Bitter Tears"
 "Suicide Blonde"
 "What You Need"
 "Kick"
 "Need You Tonight"
 "Mediate"
 "Never Tear Us Apart"
 "Who Pays The Price"
 "Devil Inside"

Notes
 The 2019 standalone CD and digital editions of the soundtrack do not feature Shining Star, which features on the end credits and on the original album and first reissue (minus Lately), but is included in the editions packaged with the Blu-ray and DVD releases.

Charts and certifications

Charts

Certifications

Live Baby Live DVD

Live Baby Live Wembley Stadium

References

1991 video albums
ARIA Award-winning albums
INXS live albums
Live video albums
1991 live albums
Albums produced by Mark Opitz
Atlantic Records live albums
Atlantic Records video albums
Mercury Records live albums
Mercury Records video albums
Warner Music Group live albums
Warner Music Group video albums
Films directed by David Mallet (director)
2010s English-language films